Little Conch Key is an island in Monroe County, Florida, United States.  It is located in the middle Florida Keys.  U.S. 1 (the Overseas Highway) crosses the key at approximately mile marker 62.2, between Duck Key and Conch Key.  It is part of the census-designated place of Duck Key.

Little Conch Key is also known as Walker's Island.

References

Islands of the Florida Keys
Islands of Monroe County, Florida
Islands of Florida